the Banque de l'Algérie, from 1949 to 1958 Banque de l'Algérie et de la Tunisie, was a French bank created in 1851, that operated as the central bank for French Algeria and, from 1904, also for the French protectorate of Tunisia until Tunisian independence. Following Algerian independence in 1962, it was succeeded by the new state’s Bank of Algeria, and its French operations were wound up in 1963.

History

The Banque de l'Algérie was created by legislation of  under the French Second Republic. From the start, it was granted the exclusive right to issue currency in French Algeria, initially for a term of twenty years.

The Banque de l’Algérie's issuance monopoly was extended to the French protectorate of Tunisia in 1904, following two decades of debates during which the Banque de Tunisie had unsuccessfully tried to secure the issuance license for itself. Following the establishment of the French protectorate in Morocco and in the context of World War I, the Banque de l'Algérie's notes became legal tender in French Morocco, together with Metropolitan French and traditional Moroccan currencies. Calls were made for monetary unification of French North Africa under the aegis of the Banque de l'Algérie, but the costly monetary competition eventually led to an agreement with the State Bank of Morocco that left the latter in charge of most monetary policy operations in the protectorate.

In January 1949, it was renamed the Banque de l'Algérie et de la Tunisie, but that change was reversed on  following Tunisian independence and the establishment of the Central Bank of Tunisia.

Leadership

 Édouard Lichtlin (1851-1859)
 Auguste Adolphe Villiers (1859-1875)
 Julien Ernest Chevallier (1875-1886)
 Félix Nelson Chiérico (1886-1897)
 Amédée Rihouet (1897-1898)
 Marc Lafon (1898-1906)
 Émile Moreau (1906-1926)
 Paul Ernest-Picard (1926-1934)
 Louis Escallier (1934-1946)
  (1946-1949)
 Marcel Flouret (1949-1952)
 Jean Watteau (1952-1962)
 Gilles Warnier de Wailly (1962-1963)

See also
 Bank of Java
 Banque de l'Indochine
 Banque de l'Afrique Occidentale
 Banque de Madagascar
 Banque de Tunisie
 State Bank of Morocco
 Compagnie Algérienne

Notes

French Algeria
Banks of Algeria
Economic history of Algeria
Currencies of Algeria
Defunct companies of Algeria
Defunct banks of France
Defunct banks of Africa
Former central banks